Olga Zelenkova (born 1967) is a retired Russian breaststroke swimmer who won a bronze medal in the 200 m breastroke event at the 1983 European Aquatics Championships.

References

1967 births
Living people
Russian female breaststroke swimmers
Soviet female breaststroke swimmers
European Aquatics Championships medalists in swimming